A paren space is a blank typographic unit equal to the size of a parenthesis. Its size can fluctuate somewhat depending on which font is being used.

See also
Em (typography)
En (typography)
Figure space

Typography
Whitespace